is one of the pen names of , a Japanese writer who is best known for being the author of the manga and anime series Candy Candy.

Kyoko Mizuki won the Kodansha Manga Award for Best Shōjo Manga for Candy Candy in 1977 with Yumiko Igarashi.

Keiko Nagita won the Japan Juvenile Writers Association Prize for Rainette, Kin Iro no Ringo (Rainette - The Golden Apples) in 2007.

Her short story Akai Mi Haziketa is printed in Japanese Primary School Textbook for 6th grade (Mitsumura Tosho Publishing Co., Ltd.).

Her picture book Shampoo Ōji series (art by Makoto Kubota) was adapted into an anime television series in October 2007.

Biography
When she was 12 years old, her father died. Then she created "imaginary family Andrews" to relieve her loneliness and wrote their stories on a notebook. 
Mizuki said "I feel Andrews family have watched me affectionately. They are the origin of my story writing".

She spent a few years as an actress of Shiki Theatre Company in her late teens, and some of her works reflect this.

In eleventh-grade, she won a prize short story contest for young girls' magazine Jogakusei no Tomo. After selling her short story Yomigaeri, Soshite Natsu wa to the magazine when she was 19 years old, she decided to become a full-time writer.

In those days she was a frequent contributor of poems to Koukou Bungei magazine, famous poet Katsumi Sugawara appreciated her talent and she joined his poetry club. When she was 20, she published a collection of poems Kaeru privately. Five years later, her poetical works Omoide wa Utawanai was published by Sanrio Company, Ltd.

She wrote short stories and love stories for young girls' magazines, and Kodansha commissioned her to write stories for their shōjo manga magazine Shōjo Friend. In the 1970s, she wrote many shōjo manga stories as Ayako Kazu, Akane Kouda, Kyoko Mizuki and Keiko Nagita.

In 1975, she wrote the story of freckled hearty girl, Candy Candy for monthly Nakayoshi.
In her twenties, she wrote the first story for a manga at the request of Mr. Higashiura, then the chief editor of Bessatsu Shōjo Friend. She wrote many shōjo manga stories for mainly Friend and Nakayoshi in 1970s. Then, Mr. Higashiura who took up the post of the chief editor of Monthly Nakayoshi drew up a project that a shōjo manga like a famous stories retold for children as Heidi.

She said  (quote: "Interviews with Manga Authors" by Itou Ayako. Doubun Shoin inc.).

The manga was adapted into anime television series in 1976 by Toei Animation. Since then Candy Candy has made her one of the more successful female manga writers.

The last episode of Candy Candy was written at Domaine De Beauvois, a chateau-hotel in France. Mizuki said "I wanted to say good-bye to Candice in  beautiful place. If possible, I wanted to go to the United Kingdom When I was into the room, tears welled up in my eyes because a picture of fox hunting was hung on the wall. Fox hunting--it took Anthony's life. When I remember Candice, autumn days at the beautiful hotel came to my mind. The hotel was like the villa of Ardray family."

Since 1980, she is mainly writing juveniles and love stories for young girls as Keiko Nagita. Her Fūko to Yūrei series is especially popular. Music for Fūko to Yūrei series was composed by  who is a member of Japanese famous rock group Moonriders, the album called Siriau Maekara Zutto Suki 知りあう前からずっと好き was released in 1995.

In 2001, she returned to publishing with the concluding part of Fūko to Yūrei.

She won the Japan Juvenile Writers Association Prize 2007 for Rainette, Kin Iro no Ringo, a love story of a Japanese girl and a Belarusian boy who was exposed to radiation of Chernobyl Nuclear Power Plant.

In May 2008, she wrote a story for Shōjo manga after an interval of 18 years. The manga Loreley was drawn by Kaya Tachibana.

She has a husband and a daughter, they enjoy vacation at their cottage in Prince Edward Island every summer. Terry Kamikawa, a student of Anne of Green Gables and hostess of Blue Winds Tea Room in P.E.I, is her best friend.

She has a collection of heart shaped objects. Part of her collection is shown on the Aoitori Bunko official site.

Selected bibliography

Manga
 Sanremo ni Kanpai サンレモにかんぱい (as Keiko Nagita, art by Waki Yamato) 1970
 Brandenburg no Asa ブランデンブルグの朝 (as Keiko Nagita, art by Waki Yamato) 1970
 Le Grand Anne Gou wa Yuku ル・グラン・アンヌ号はゆく (as Keiko Nagita, art by Waki Yamato) 1970
 Greenhill Monogatari グリーンヒル物語 (as Keiko Nagita, art by Yasuko Aoike) 1970-1971
 Lorient no Aoi Sora ロリアンの青い空 (as Keiko Nagita, art by Yoko Shima) 1974-1975
 Candy Candy キャンディ・キャンディ (as Kyoko Mizuki, art by Yumiko Igarashi) 1975-1979
 Etruria no Ken エトルリアの剣 (as Keiko Nagita, art by Kyoko Fumizuki) 1975
 Miriam Blue no Mizuumi　ミリアムブルーの湖 (as Keiko Nagita, art by Yasuko Aoike) 1975
 Hoshi eno Kaidan 星への階段 (as Akane Kouda, art by Akemi Matsuzaki) 1975
 Byakuya no Nightingale 白夜のナイチンゲール (as Keiko Nagita, art by Yoko Shima) 1976-1977
 Bara no Ki　薔薇の樹 (as Kyoko Mizuki, art by Chikako Kikukawa) 1978
 Premier Muguet プルミエ・ミュゲ (as Kyoko Mizuki, art by Yoko Hanabusa) 1979-1981
 Kirara Boshi no Daiyogen きらら星の大予言 (as Kyoko Mizuki, art by Yū Asagiri) 1980-1981
 Sunday's Child  サンデイズチャイルド(as Kyoko Mizuki, art by Tsubasa Nunoura) 1980-1981
 Tim Tim Circus ティム・ティム・サーカス (as Kyoko Mizuki, art by Yumiko Igarashi) 1981-1982
 Loreley ローレライ (as Kyoko Mizuki, art by Kaya Tachibana) 2008

Novels
As Keiko Nagita
 Candy Candy キャンディ・キャンディ 1978
 Umi ni Otiru Yuki 海におちる雪 1980
 Night Game ナイトゲ－ム 1985
 Moonlight Express ム－ンライト・エクスプレス 1986
 Fūko to Yūrei series ふ－ことユ－レイ (art by Yumi Kayama) 1988-2002
 Umizikan no Marin 海時間のマリン 1992
 Akai Mi Haziketa 赤い実はじけた 1999
 Hoshi no Kakera 星のかけら 2000-2001
 Tenshi no Hashigo 天使のはしご 2002-2003
 Koppu no Naka no Yuuzora コップのなかの夕空 2004-2005
 air 2003
 Rainette, Kin Iro no Ringo レネット　金色の林檎 2006
 Ballerina Jikenbo series バレリーナ事件簿 2006-2008
 Birthday Club series バースディクラブ (art by Yu Azuki) 2006-

Poems
As Keiko Nagita
 Kaeru 還る 1969
 Omoide wa Utawanai 思い出は歌わない 1974
 Otanjoubi ni お誕生日に (art by Yoko Sano) 1975
 Fifty フィフティ 2004

Essays
As Keiko Nagita
 Mouitido Utatte もういちど歌って 1978
 Nagita Keiko Hitoritabi 名木田恵子ひとり旅 1980
 Anne no Shima, Kazedayori アンの島・風だより 1993 collaboration with Terry Kamikawa
 Islander Monogatari, Anne no Sima no Hitobito アイランダ－物語　アンの島の人々 1997

Picture books
As Keiko Nagita
 kodansha Ohimesama Ehon4 Ningyohime 講談社おひめさま絵本4 にんぎょひめ (art by Makoto Takahashi) 1971
 Nemutai Kirin ねむたいキリン (art by Keiji Nakamura) 1979
 Monmonku wa Yasasii モンモンクはやさしい (art by Makoto Obo) 1979
 Shampoo Ōji no Bouken シャンプー王子のぼうけん (art by Makoto Kubota) 2004
 Shampoo Ōji to Kitanai Kotoba シャンプー王子ときたないことば (art by Makoto Kubota) 2005
 Shampoo Ōji to Daiakutou シャンプー王子と大あくとう (art by Makoto Kubota) 2006

Lyrics
As Keiko Nagita
 Candy Candy キャンディ・キャンディ (composition: Takeo Watanabe, performance：Mitsuko Horie)
 Ashita ga Suki あしたがすき (composition: Takeo Watanabe, performance：Mitsuko Horie)
 Futari kiri no Lullaby ふたりきりのララバイ (composition: Juichi Sase, performance：Ruo Megimi)
 Tazunebito futagoza 尋ね人ふたご座 (composition: Juichi Sase, performance：Ruo Megimi)
 Ame no Suizokukan 雨の水族館 (composition: Satsuya Iwasawa, performance：Ruo Megimi)
 Shabondama Love しゃぼんだまラブ (composition: Masami Koizumi, performance：Ruo Megimi)
 Shiriau Maekara Zutto Suki 知りあう前からずっと好き (composition: Toru Okada, performance：Yoko Ishida)
 Shizuku wa Anata no Sign しずくはあなたのサイン (composition: Toru Okada, performance：Mitsuko Horie)
 Uwasa Shitteruwa 噂知ってるわ (composition and performance：Miyuki Yokoyama)
 Shampoo Ōji no Bouken シャンプー王子の冒険 (composition: Hironobu Kageyama, performance：Ikuko)
 Shampoo Ōji no Komoriuta シャンプー王子の子守唄 (composition: Hironobu Kageyama, performance：Mayu Miyauchi)

References

 Kenji, Ando. Fuuin Sakuhin no Nazo 2 封印作品の謎 2. Ohta Publishing Co. (2006) 
 Saiko, Ito. Manga Gensakusha Interviewers まんが原作者インタビューズ. Dobunshoin (1999)

Notes

External links
Mizuki's official site (in Japanese)
(English/Japanese)
 
Shampoo Ōji animated series official site (in Japanese) 

1949 births
Manga artists
Women manga artists
Japanese female comics artists
Japanese women novelists
Living people
Winner of Kodansha Manga Award (Shōjo)